American actor James Earl Jones has had an extensive career in various film, television, and theater. He started out in film by appearing in the 1964 political satire film Dr. Strangelove as Lt. Lothar Zogg. He then went on to star in the 1970 film The Great White Hope as Jack Jefferson, a role he first played in the Broadway production of the same name. The film role earned him two Golden Globe nominations, one for Best Actor and winning one for New Star of the Year. He also received an Academy Award nomination for Best Actor. His other work in the 1970s included playing the title character in Malcolm X (1972), Johnny Williams in The River Niger (1976), Nick Debrett in Swashbuckler (1976), Malcolm X again in The Greatest (1977), and The Bushido Blade with Richard Boone (1979).

Jones has notably voiced the antagonist Darth Vader in the Star Wars franchise, first in the trilogy films - Star Wars (1977), The Empire Strikes Back (1980), Return of the Jedi (1983) then again in the first installment of the Star Wars anthology series - Rogue One (2016), and the third installment of the sequel trilogy, Star Wars: The Rise of Skywalker. He is also notable for voicing the Disney character Mufasa, first in the 1994 animated film The Lion King, its sequel The Lion King II: Simba's Pride (1998), and the 2019 photorealistic computer-animated remake of the same name.

In the 1980s, Jones had co-starring roles in the films Conan the Barbarian with Arnold Schwarzenegger (1982), Soul Man with C. Thomas Howell (1986), Allan Quatermain and the Lost City of Gold with Richard Chamberlain (1987), Matewan with Chris Cooper (1987), Coming to America with Eddie Murphy  (1988) and Field of Dreams with Kevin Costner (1989). In 1990, Jones was first cast as the role of Admiral James Greer in the action thriller film The Hunt for Red October, a film based on Tom Clancy's novel of the same name. He reprised the role again in Patriot Games (1992) and Clear and Present Danger (1994), both films he co-starred with Harrison Ford, who was also in the first three Star Wars franchise films. He also played Mr. Mertle in The Sandlot (1993), a role he reprised again in The Sandlot 2 (2005). His later roles include Gimme Shelter with Rosario Dawson (2013), and The Angriest Man in Brooklyn with Robin Williams (2014), one of Williams' last films before his death. In 2008 and 2011, Jones won the Screen Actors Guild Life Achievement Award and Academy Honorary Award respectively for his career in film.

Jones' television work includes playing Woodrow Paris in the series Paris between 1979 and 1980. He voiced various characters on the animated series The Simpsons in three separate seasons (1990, 1994, 1998). He then was cast as Gabriel Bird, the lead role in the series Gabriel's Fire which aired from 1990 to 1991. For that role, he won the Primetime Emmy Award for Outstanding Lead Actor in a Drama Series and was nominated for his fourth Golden Globe Award, this time for Best Actor in a Television Series Drama. He played Bird again in the series Pros and Cons with ran from 1991 to 1992, that earned him his fifth and final Golden Globe Award for Best Actor in a Television Series Drama. He then had small appearances in the series Law & Order (1993), Picket Fences (1994), Mad About You (1997), Touched by an Angel (1997), Frasier (1997). His role in Picket Fences earned him another Primetime Emmy Award nomination, one for Outstanding Guest Actor in a Drama Series. His later television work includes small roles in Everwood (2003–2004), Two and a Half Men (2008), House (2009), and The Big Bang Theory (2014).

Jones' theater work includes numerous Broadway plays, including Sunrise at Campobello (19581959), Danton's Death (1965), The Iceman Cometh (19731974), Of Mice and Men (19741975), Othello (1982), On Golden Pond (2005), Cat on a Hot Tin Roof (2008) and You Can't Take It with You (20142015). He was also in various off Broadway productions and Shakespeare stage adaptations such as The Merchant of Venice (1962), The Winter's Tale (1963), Othello (19641965), Coriolanus (1965), Hamlet (1972), and King Lear (1973). His roles in The Great White Hope (1969) and Fences (1987) earned him two Tony Awards, both for Best Leading Actor in a Play.

Film

Television series

Television films

Narrator

Theatre

Video games

Sources

References

External links 
 

Male actor filmographies
American filmographies